Kamil Shamilevich Mullin (born 5 January 1994) is a Russian professional football player who plays as a forward for FC Volgar Astrakhan on loan from FC Rubin Kazan.

Club career

Lokomotiv
Mullin joined Lokomotiv academy at 16 years, and two years later made it to the youth squad. In total, he played 53 games for Lokomotiv U21 and scored 23 goals.
He made his debut for Lokomotiv first team in the 2012–13 Russian Cup game vs Torpedo Armavir on 26 September 2012.
In March 2013, Mullin for the first time was included into team sheet for the League match vs Rubin. In the same month he was nominated for FC Lokomotiv Player of the Month and won this prize.

Rubin
On 1 February 2014, Lokomotiv and Rubin announced an agreement for player's transfer. Mullin signed four-and-a-half-year deal with Kazan club. He made his debut for Rubin on 21 February 2014 in a Europa League game against Real Betis. He made his Russian Premier League debut for Rubin on 9 March 2014 against FC Anzhi Makhachkala.

Career statistics

References

External links
 
 
 
 
 Profile by FC Lokomotiv site 

1994 births
Footballers from Moscow
Tatar sportspeople
Living people
Russian footballers
Russia youth international footballers
Russia under-21 international footballers
Association football forwards
FC Lokomotiv Moscow players
FC Rubin Kazan players
FC Sokol Saratov players
FC Tyumen players
FC Rotor Volgograd players
FC Neftekhimik Nizhnekamsk players
FC Volgar Astrakhan players
Russian Premier League players
Russian First League players